Weidlinger may refer to:

Günther Weidlinger (born April 5, 1978), an Austrian long-distance runner
Weidlinger Associates, a US engineering company founded by Paul Weidlinger in 1949

See also
Weidling (disambiguation)